R. A. Villanueva is a Filipino American poet. His debut collection, Reliquaria, won the 2013 Prairie Schooner Book Prize.
He is a founding editor of Tongue: A Journal of Writing & Art.

Early life and education
He was born in New Jersey and graduated from Rutgers University, located in New Brunswick, New Jersey. He holds an MFA degree from New York University.

Career
Villanueva's writing has appeared online at Guernica, Prac Crit, and McSweeney's Internet Tendency as well as in print publications, such as Poetry, the American Poetry Review, AGNI, Gulf Coast, Virginia Quarterly Review, Bellevue Literary Review, Ambit, and DIAGRAM. His work has also been featured by the Academy of American Poets and on BBC Radio London. Villanueva's poem, "Life Drawing,"  was the focus of the December 4, 2020 episode of the podcast, Poetry Unbound.

Awards
His honors include commendations from the Forward Prizes and the 2013 Ninth Letter Literary Award for Poetry, and fellowships from Kundiman, The Constance Saltonstall Foundation for the Arts, and the Asian American Literary Review.

Works

See also

 List of poets from the United States
 List of Rutgers University people

References

External links

Author page
Video: from the P.O.P. series by the Academy of American Poets
Audio: recording of R. A. Villanueva, Ishion Hutchinson, Anne Carson and Robert Currie > September 21, 2014 at Berl's Brooklyn Poetry Shop
Audio: "Fish Heads" > March 30, 2020 episode of The Slowdown with Tracy K. Smith
Interview: Oxford Poetry > Winter 2017 with Mary Jean Chan
Interview: APIA Kundiman poetry series > May 21, 2014 with The Best American Poetry
Interview: National Book Critics Circle: Small Press Spotlight > September 15, 2014 with Rigoberto González
Review: The Rumpus > March 14th, 2015 > Review by Kenji C. Liu of Reliquaria

Year of birth missing (living people)
Place of birth missing (living people)
20th-century births
21st-century American poets
American magazine editors
American magazine founders
American magazine writers
American male poets
American writers of Filipino descent
English-language poets
Living people
Poets from New Jersey
Rutgers University alumni
21st-century American non-fiction writers
American male non-fiction writers
21st-century American male writers